Helpaphorus is a genus of moths in the family Pterophoridae.

Species
Helpaphorus boby Gibeaux, 1994
Helpaphorus festivus (Bigot, 1964)
Helpaphorus griveaudi (Bigot, 1964)
Helpaphorus imaitso Gibeaux, 1994
Helpaphorus testaceus Gibeaux, 1994

Oidaematophorini